Shangla Pass connects Swat District of Khyber Pakhtunkhwa, Pakistan with Shangla District, with further connections beyond to Gilgit Baltistan.

References
 Shang-La Pass Photos
 Encyclopedia of Pakistan by Zahid Hussain Anjum. Jahangir Book Depot, Pakistan 2005-06

Mountain passes of Khyber Pakhtunkhwa